This article contains lists of named passenger trains in Indonesia, which are operational on Java and Sumatra by the national railway company, PT Kereta Api Indonesia (Indonesian Railways Company).

Executive class
As of 2021, all executive class trains service have been standardized, but trains who previously have the title "Argo" retained the title, although they have no differences from other executive class trains.

Argo subclass 
All of Argo class trains have got their name from the mountains in Indonesia, except Argo Cheribon, Argo Jati, Argo Dwipangga, and Argo Parahyangan.

Fauna subclass

Mixed class

Executive, business and economy class

Executive and business class

Executive and premium economy class

Executive and economy plus/economy class

Business and economy class

Economy class

Premium economy class

Economy plus class

Economy class
Some trains in this class are subsidized by the government through a public service obligation.

Known as: PSO class, non-commercial economy class, subsidized economy class.

Local economy class

Blora Jaya (Semarang Poncol - Cepu)
 Jatiluhur (Cikampek - Cikarang)
 Walahar (Purwakarta - Cikarang)
 Lokal Ekonomi Bojonegoro (Sidoarjo - Surabaya Pasar Turi - Bojonegoro)
 Lokal Ekonomi Kertosono (Surabaya Kota - Jombang - Kertosono)
 Lokal Bandung Raya (Padalarang - Bandung - Cicalengka)
 Pandanwangi (Jember - Ketapang)
 Penataran (Surabaya Kota - Malang - Blitar)
 Rapih Dhoho (Surabaya Kota - Kertosono - Blitar)
 Sibinuang (Padang - Naras)
 Simandra/Lokal Cibatu (Cibatu - Purwakarta)
 Tumapel (Malang - Surabaya Gubeng)

Diesel multiple units

Air-conditioned
 Cepu Express
 Komuter Jenggala 
 Kedung Sepur
 Komuter Sulam
 Madiun Jaya Express
 Minangkabau Express
 Prambanan Express
Komuter Supor

Non-air-conditioned

 Sri Lelawangsa
 Way Umpu
 Seminung
 Cut Meutia

Non-operational

Formerly operational

 Argo Bromo
 Argo Gede
 Argo Jati
 Argopuro
 Badrasurya
 Baraya Geulis
 Bumi Geulis
 Cantik Ekspres
 Cepat Sidareja
 Cianjuran
 Cipuja
 Cirebon Ekspres
 Cisadane
 Citrajaya
 Dolok Martimbang
 Empu Jaya
 Fajar Utama Semarang
 Fajar Utama Solo
 Feeder Purworejo
 Feeder Semarang-Bojonegoro
 Feeder Wonogiri
 Galuh
 Gaya Baru Malam Utara
 Gunung Jati Ekspres
 Jatayu
 Jayabaya Selatan
 Jayabaya Utara
 Joglokerto
 Kaligangsa
 Kaligung Mas
 Kalijaga
 Kalimaya
 Kamandanu
 Krakatau
 Kuda Putih
 Limex Gaja Baru
 Lokal Rangkas
 Madiun Ekspres
 Maharani
 Mahesa
 Malang Ekspres
 Mataram
 Merak Jaya
 Mutiara Utara
 Pajajaran
 Pandanaran
 Pandanwangi
 Papandayan Ekspres
 Parahyangan
 Patas Bandung Raya
 Patas Merak
 Pekalongan Ekspres
 Penataran Utama
 Priangan Ekspres
 Purbaya
 Putri Hijau
 Rangkas Jaya
 Rengganis
 Senja Singosari
 Senja Utama Semarang
 Senja Utama Solo
 Solo Jaya
 Sriwedari
 Suryajaya
 Tawang Mas
 Tawangmangu
 Tegal Arum
 Tegal Bahari
 Tirtonadi

Noted in Gapeka 1961

See also
 List of named trains in :id:Daftar kereta api di Indonesia (Indonesian Wikipedia)

References

External links

  Official website of Indonesian Railways

Passenger rail transport in Indonesia